Baixa de Cassanje, also called Baixa de Kassanje is a non-sovereign kingdom in Angola. Kambamba Kulaxingo was its king until his death in 2006. 
Presently, Dianhenga Aspirante Mjinji Kulaxingo serves as the king.

History
The region of Baixa de Cassanje, in the district of Malanje, Portuguese Angola, before independence in 1975, was an important cotton producing area. The January 4, 1961, Baixa de Cassanje revolt is considered a trigger for the Angolan War of Independence (1961-1974), which however was being prepared by several pro-independence guerrillas in neighbouring African countries under support of world powers such as the Soviet Union.

See also
Baixa de Cassanje revolt
Angolan War of Independence
Grupo Desportivo Baixa de Cassanje

References

Politics of Angola
Non-sovereign monarchy